Pedro I el Cruel is a Spanish limited drama television series directed by Francisco Abad and written by Graciela Sáenz de Heredia about the life of Peter I of Castile, "the Cruel". It aired on TVE1 in January 1989.

Cast 
  as Peter the Cruel.
 Marisa de Leza as Queen Mother of Castile.
 Juan Luis Galiardo.
 .
 Fernando Guillén.
 Jaime Blanch.
 Fernando Cebrián.
 Lluís Homar.
 José Sancho.
 Jesús Ruimán as Henry of Trastámara.

Production and release 
Pedro I el Cruel was directed by Francisco Abad whereas the screenplay was authored by Graciela Sáenz de Heredia. The series, one of the several biographical miniseries released by the Spanish public broadcaster in the 1980s, had a 200 million peseta budget, an amount described as "cheap" by the director. The series was shot in 1988 in different locations including the Castle of Peñafiel. It premiered on 9 January 1989 on TVE. The broadcasting run of the 10-episode miniseries ended on 20 January 1989.

References 

Television shows filmed in Spain
1989 Spanish television series debuts
1989 Spanish television series endings
1980s Spanish drama television series
Television series set in the 14th century
La 1 (Spanish TV channel) network series
Spanish biographical television series
Spanish-language television shows